Stanisław Kurnatowski (1823-1912) was a Polish nobleman, landed gentry, and a member of the Sejm of the Grand Duchy of Posen and the Reichstag. He was active in the Polish Party.

1823 births
1912 deaths
Politicians from Poznań
People from the Grand Duchy of Posen
Members of the Sejm (Provinziallandtag) of Posen
Clan of Łodzia
19th-century Polish landowners
20th-century Polish landowners